Hins Cheung King Hin (born 1 February 1981), is a Chinese-born Hong Kong singer, songwriter, record producer, and businessperson. He made his debut in 2001 with the studio album Hins' First. He has since released 17 studio albums and EPs. Among his various accolades, he has won the Ultimate Song Chart Awards Best Male Singer Gold prize six times, Jade Solid Gold Most Popular Male Singer four times, and Best Pop Male Singer at the Top Ten Chinese Gold Songs Awards. In 2021, he was shortlisted for Asia's Most Influential by Tatler Asia.

Besides his music career, Cheung also owns Avon Recording Studios, bridal brand Sennet Frères, and also invested into restaurants of his own design, including Junon and The Crown, both in Wanchai.

Early life and education 
Cheung was born in Guangzhou, China, and raised in Guangdong Province, with ancestry from Beijing. He graduated from Dongshan Peizheng Primary School, Guangzhou Seventh Middle School and Guangzhou Wuyang Financial and Economic Vocational School. Influenced by the strong musical atmosphere in his family since he was a child, he began training in Peking Opera and musical instruments (piano and violin) at the age of four, and practiced opening his voice every day.  He quickly became comfortable with learning music and was regarded as a musical genius, but gave up after only half of his violin lessons. Due to his poor grades and his father's advice, he eventually chose to study accounting at a vocational school after hoping to go to an art school in high school.

Career
In 2001, Cheung released his self-produced debut album Hins' First. In 2002, he relocated to Hong Kong after signing with Universal Music. His album My Way was released in August 2002. The title track "My Way" topped the Global Chinese Music Chart for two weeks.

On August 16, 2007, Cheung released his second Cantonese studio album Ardently Love. The title track "Ardently Love" achieved widespread critical and commercial success, winning Song of the Year and My Favourite Song at the 2007 Ultimate Song Chart Awards Presentation.

Originally scheduled for eight shows beginning on November 15, 2019, Cheung's concert featuring the Hong Kong Chinese Orchestra, Hins Cheung X HKCO was cancelled due to the 2019 Hong Kong protests. The concert was successfully rescheduled for November 22, 2020. Hins became the first artist to perform at the Hong Kong Coliseum during the Covid-19 pandemic, with the attendee capacity limited at 50%.

On 7 January 2021, Cheung unexpectedly released his eighth Cantonese studio album The Brightest Darkness without any prior announcement. The 17-track album was released by Fitto Records. The music video for the lead single "The Way We Were" (俏郎君) was released to YouTube on the same day. "The Way We Were" went on to top five local music charts and won Ultimate Song Chart Awards Top Ten Songs Number 3, and Chill Club Song of the Year Number 5. The Brightest Darkness won Best Album at the Ultimate Song Chart Awards, making Cheung the second artist to have wins in all major categories at the Ultimate Song Chart Awards, after Jacky Cheung in 2005.

On October 19, 2021, Cheung posted on his YouTube channel a promotional video for his upcoming concert The Next 20 Hins Live in Hong Kong. Under the guidance of a professional rock climber, Cheung climbed the lighting rod atop Lee Garden Two in Causway Bay, reaching 246m off the ground. The concert was scheduled for 18 shows starting December 23 at the Hong Kong Coliseum. Due to Hong Kong's fifth COVID-19 wave, shows scheduled for January 6 onward were rescheduled. On April 21, rescheduled show dates were announced, with an additional 8 shows to compensate for capacity limits.

Discography

Studio albums 
 Hins My Way (2002)
 A.M./P.M.'' (2004)
 Spring, Summer, Autumn, Winter (2006)
 The Book of Laughter and Forgetting (2006)
 Ardently Love (2007)
 Urban Emotions (2008)
 Love & Living (2009)
 No. Eleven (2010)
 Morph (2014)
 Felix - Me & Mr. Cheung (2015)
 Senses Inherited (2018)
 The Brightest Darkness (2021)

 Extended plays 
 Hins' First (2001)
 Park of Loneliness (2004)
 Why Not? (2012)
 Vibes (2016)
 The Whimsical Voyage (2017)

Filmography

 Feature films 
 In-Laws, Out-Laws (2004)
 Moments of Love (2005)
 Love Is Not All Around (2007)
 Wonder Women (2007)
 Dancing Lion (2007)
 In the Name of... Love (2008)
 The Legend Is Born: Ip Man (2010)
 The Midas Touch (2013)
 Golden Chicken 3 (2014)
 Shining Moment (2017)
  (2023)

Theatrical plays
 Big Nose (2006)
 Perfect Match (2008)
 Octave (2010)
 I Have a Date with Autumn (2012)
 Bent (2015)
 Equus (2016)

Umbrella Movement involvement and Singer 2017 controversy
On January 10, 2017, Cheung was among the eight singers participating on the fifth season Hunan Television's reality competition I Am a Singer; for that season it was the first season to be renamed to the current and simplified title of Singer. However, prior to the announcement, Cheung revealed that he was still involved in the Umbrella Movement resulting in the dismay of his supporters and caused backlash on the Cheung's responsibility, in which he denied at the time.

On January 13, the show's official blog page removed all of Cheung's references and related articles. The following day, the blog for another Hunan TV series, Mango TV Divas (芒果台女汉子) broke the news for Cheung's involvement in the Umbrella Involvement and its impact; Cheung announced his withdrawal from Singer 2017 shortly after the news.

On January 17, four days before the season premiere, Cheung was announced to have withdrawn from the competition; Emperor Entertainment Group's spokesman reveal that they have terminated Cheung's involvement from his entertainment agency, and cited that Cheung's actions, whether correct or otherwise, had caused "great pressure on the singer and the TV station, and the singer himself can't concentrate on preparing for the contest", confirming his withdrawal, and his performance ("吻得太逼真") for the first episode (which was taped prior on January 10) were to be edited out of air (except for a part of the results which also involved another contestant, Teresa Carpio); per the rules of I Am a Singer'' for withdrawn singers (which has also happened for at least one singer from the first three seasons), Cheung was not allowed to have any further involvement in the show, and he was ineligible in participating Returning performances and Breakout rounds. As of the recent season in 2020, Cheung was the only contestant to have participated in the show but without any mention or appearance during the show's air entirely. However, it was revealed on February on the same year, Cheung was cleared on the controversy and was reinstated in the media agency.

References

External links

 
 
 
Hins Concert 
Hins Cheung Hongkong Concert

1981 births
Living people
Cantopop singers
Chinese male singers
Musicians from Guangzhou
20th-century Hong Kong male singers
21st-century Hong Kong male singers